Macedonia, under the name of Former Yugoslav Republic of Macedonia, competed at the 2012 Summer Olympics in London, United Kingdom, held from 27 July to 12 August 2012. This was the nation's fifth consecutive appearance at the Summer Olympics in the post-Yugoslav era.

Four athletes were selected to the team by wild card places, without having qualified, competing only in athletics and swimming. This was also the nation's smallest delegation 
to be sent to the Games in the post-Yugoslav era. Marko Blaževski, medley swimmer and finance student at the Wingate University in North Carolina, was appointed by the Macedonian Olympic Committee to be the nation's flag bearer at the opening ceremony. For the first time in Olympic history, Macedonia did not qualify athletes in freestyle wrestling, slalom canoeing, and shooting.

Macedonia failed for the third consecutive time to win an Olympic medal.

Athletics

Macedonian athletes received wild cards for both men's and women's 400 metres.

Key
 Note – Ranks given for track events are within the athlete's heat only
 Q = Qualified for the next round
 q = Qualified for the next round as a fastest loser or, in field events, by position without achieving the qualifying target
 NR = National record
 N/A = Round not applicable for the event
 Bye = Athlete not required to compete in round

Men

Women

Swimming

Macedonia has selected one swimmer to qualify in the Olympic Games.

Men

Women

References

Nations at the 2012 Summer Olympics
2012
2012 in Republic of Macedonia sport